Vykáň is a municipality and village in Nymburk District in the Central Bohemian Region of the Czech Republic. It has about 400 inhabitants.

History
The first written mention of Vykáň is from 993, when Adalbert of Prague donated the village to the newly established Břevnov Monastery. It was owned by the monastery until the Hussite Wars.

References

Villages in Nymburk District